František Rydval (born 21 February 1946) is a Czech ski jumper. He competed in the normal hill and large hill events at the 1968 Winter Olympics.

References

1946 births
Living people
Czech male ski jumpers
Olympic ski jumpers of Czechoslovakia
Ski jumpers at the 1968 Winter Olympics
Sportspeople from Liberec